Robert (Bob) Bradford Edmonds (May 8, 1928 – March 4, 2007) was a Canadian diplomat from the early 1950s to the late 1980s. Educated at the West China School, the University of Toronto School, the University of Toronto (Victoria), and Harvard University, Edmonds spoke fluent English, French and Mandarin Chinese.  

His postings included Indonesia, New Zealand, the International Control Commission in Laos (for which he was later awarded Canada's International Peacekeeping Service medal), Sweden, Hungary, New York City (United Nations), the Vatican (Holy See) and Italy.  Raised in China by missionary parent teachers,  Edmonds was part of the early negotiations between Canada and the Peoples Republic of China which led to Canada eventually becoming the first major western country to formally extend diplomatic recognition to the PRC in 1970.  In 1972 Edmonds opened Canada's first official Embassy to Hungary and served there as head of mission until 1975. 

From 1975 to 1979 he served at Canada's Mission to the United Nations working on law of the sea, outer space and other key strategic negotiations of the era.  From 1979 to 1983 he was Canada's Minister Plenipotentiary to the Vatican during the early years of John Paul II's pontificate and the Church's increasing interventionist activities in the political workings of Poland, Eastern Europe and Central and South America.

He served as Canadian Vice-Consul in Indonesia in the 1950s and as Chargé d'Affaires in Hungary (1972–75).

He married Shirley Johns from Melbourne, Australia in 1955 in Melbourne. The couple had a son Michael and a daughter Meghan. Edmonds died in March 2007 in Toronto, Ontario.

References

1928 births
2007 deaths
Canadian diplomats
Harvard University alumni
Canadian expatriates in the United States
Canadian expatriates in Indonesia
Canadian expatriates in New Zealand
Canadian expatriates in Laos
Canadian expatriates in Hungary
Canadian expatriates in Italy
Canadian expatriates in China